In the Dungeons & Dragons fantasy role-playing game, a magic item is any object that is imbued with magic powers.  These items may act on their own or be the tools of the character possessing them. Magic items have been prevalent in the game in every edition and setting, from the original edition in 1974 until the modern fifth edition. In addition to jewels and gold coins, they form part of the treasure that the players often seek in a dungeon. Magic items are generally found in treasure hoards, or recovered from fallen opponents; sometimes, a powerful or important magic item is the object of a quest.

Development

1st edition Advanced Dungeons & Dragons
In the first edition, all artifacts are classed as miscellaneous magic items, even ones that are weapons, armor, or rings. Each artifact has a certain number of Minor, Major, and Prime Powers, and of Minor, Major, and Side Effects which trigger when the item is acquired, or its Major and Prime Powers are used. The powers and effects are selected by the DM from a set of lists, so that players cannot predict the artifact's powers.

2nd edition Advanced Dungeons & Dragons 
In 1994, Encyclopedia Magica Volume One, the first of a four-volume set, was published. The series lists all of the magical items published in two decades of TSR products from "the original Dungeons & Dragons woodgrain and white box set and the first issue of The Strategic Review right up to the last product published in December of 1993". The books total more than 1500 pages across the four volumes and each volume contains over 1000 magic items. There was "no attempt to correct rule imbalances, edit entries, or even match game mechanics to one particular edition of the game".

3rd edition Dungeons & Dragons 
The 3.5 edition book Magic Item Compendium (2007) was a capstone book that reprinted, updated, organized, and regularized "numerous 3e magic items". Andy Collins, the lead designer on the project, "started this process by identifying the 'big six' magic items that took up the majority of characters' item slots: magic weapons; magic armor & shields; rings of protection; cloaks of resistance; amulets of natural armor; and ability-score boosters". Collins "identified the reasons that these [magic] items were particularly well-loved: they were cost effective, they could be improved, there was nothing else as good in their slots, they were simple, they didn't take time to activate [and] they provided effects that were required for characters to stay competitive". With this in mind, the designers then pulled items from all the 3rd and 3.5 edition books and "after looking through about 2000 magic items, they looted the best 1000 or so". 

The Magic Item Compendium also showed some early hallmarks of 4th edition design: items were marked levels and some items appeared at multiple strengths. It also introduced the idea of item sets, where items of a set would improve as more were collected, which would then reappear in the 4th edition book Adventurer's Vault 2 (2009).

4th edition Dungeons & Dragons
Many magic items in this edition "have an enhancement value" which improves a character's basic stats. This enhancement value is a "persistent, always-on" ability. Additionally, some magical items contain a daily power usable by the character.

The main categories of magic items in 4th edition are: armor, weapons, implements, rings, potions, and wondrous items ("a catch-all category"). Some magical items could only be used in a specific body slot and a "character can wear only one magical item per slot — a character can't use two arm slot items (say, bracers of defense and a shield of protection) at the same time. The body slots are neck, arms, feet, hands, head, and waist".

Ritual scrolls are single use consumable items, each of which contains a specific ritual (4th edition's equivalent of non-combat spells), halves the time required to perform that ritual and allows it to be performed without a ritual book. After it has been expended, a ritual scroll crumbles to dust. Unlike the scrolls of previous editions, 4th edition's scrolls are not classified as magical items.

5th edition Dungeons & Dragons 
The 5th edition Dungeon Master's Guide introduced the concept of Item Rarity, in which magic items are given a rating between Common, Uncommon, Rare, Very Rare, and Legendary to denote the frequency in which this item is expected to be found within the game. The only Common magic item to appear in the Dungeon Master's Guide is the Potion of Healing, with an additional list of Common items appearing in the supplementary book Xanathar's Guide to Everything. Artifacts act as a 6th Rarity category for items, such as the Hand of Vecna or the Wand of Orcus, in which there is only one of this item in existence. The categories of magic items in 5th edition are: Armor, Potions, Rings, Rods, Scrolls, Staffs, Wands, Weapons, and Wondrous Items (which acts as a miscellaneous category). Some items require attunement to be used, limiting the number of items a character can benefit from at once to 3 attunable items.

Notable magic items
Aegis-fang
The magical war hammer of Wulfgar, a character from the Forgotten Realms novels and campaign setting.
Bag of Holding
This fictional bag is capable of containing objects larger than its own size. This iconic item in the game is coveted by players because it mitigates encumbrance (the game mechanic for the carrying capacity of a player character). Since its introduction, it and concepts like it have appeared in other media. A number of academics have noted that the bag of holding also has symbolic meaning and uses, such as Benjamin Woo who has used the Bag of Holding as a way of understanding white privilege: "Like the Bag of Holding—a kind of magical 'knapsack' in Dungeons & Dragons and other fantasy games—white privilege is much bigger than it appears from the outside."
Bag of Tricks
By reaching into this remarkable bag, a game character can pull out one of the small fuzzy items inside which then turn into some type of animal, depending on luck anything from a weasel to a rhinoceros.
Blue Crystal Staff
The Blue Crystal Staff is a magical item with healing powers in the Dragonlance campaign setting. It plays a central role in Dragonlance: Dragons of Autumn Twilight. The story of the discovery of the Staff by a barbarian named Riverwind is presented in several different versions within the Dragonlance franchise.
Disks of Mishakal
The Disks of Mishakal contain the teachings of the "True Gods", in the Dragonlance campaign setting. They are described as thin disks of platinum bound together. After the Cataclysm, the disks were hidden in the ruined city Xak Tsaroth. They were guarded by the black dragon, Khisanth (Onyx).  The Disks were found by the companions in the first book in the Chronicles series called Dragons of Autumn Twilight.
The player characters in the computer game Advanced Dungeons & Dragons: Heroes of the Lance must retrieve the Disks of Mishakal from the lair of Khisanth in the ruins of Xak Tsaroth. The characters must use the Disks to prevent Takhisis from creating her evil empire.
Dragonlances
The eponymous weapons of the Dragonlance campaign setting, these magical lances have a devastating effect on dragons. Dragonlances are a major factor in defeating the evil Dragonarmies in the Chronicles novels. In an earlier point in history of the setting, a character named Huma Dragonbane defeats Takhisis herself with a dragonlance, an evil goddess consistently causing strife in the novels. Huma's use of the artifact is presented in several differing versions within the franchise.
Girdle of femininity/masculinity
The girdle of femininity/masculinity first appeared in the original 1979 Dungeon Masters Guide, detailed on page 145. Such a girdle looks like an ordinary leather belt, but when worn immediately switches the wearer's sex to the opposite gender, then loses all power. Additionally, 10% of these items remove the sex of the wearer. The change causes no actual damage, but it is permanent. The Girdles are included in the first and the second editions of AD&D, their magic potent enough to be fiendishly difficult to reverse; even a Wish spell has even odds, though a deity can set things right. They appear to be absent from the third edition, though similar effects are mentioned as a possible curse outcome. Using a Girdle is the best-known if not only method to bring about such an effect. "Reverse user's gender" is also one of the random cursed item effects in the 3rd edition of D&D. One such item also makes an appearance in Baldur's Gate, where it's among the first magical objects the player finds, but only takes a Remove Curse to do away with. The webcomic The Order of the Stick introduces a Girdle early on and brings it back much later, where it's used to good effect and later yet undone with a Remove Curse.
Philter of Love
A magical potion, the fictional version of an aphrodisiac, that causes attraction of a person of the other sex and is a rare mention of love in the game.
Portable hole
In the game, a portable hole is a circle of cloth made from phase spider webs, strands of ether and beams of starlight. When deployed, it creates an extradimensional space six feet in diameter by ten feet deep. Folding the cloth causes the entrance to this space to disappear, but items placed inside the hole remain there. Sufficient air is contained in the hole to support life for up to ten minutes. If put inside a bag of holding, both items are destroyed by a dimensional rupture.
Staff of Magius
A magic staff from the world of Dragonlance, it was named after its most famous wielder from the setting's past even though it was created long before Magius obtained it. It the Dragonlance novels, it was in the possession of the main character Raistlin.

Major artifacts
Artifacts in the game are unique magic items  with great power. Major artifacts include the ones in the following table. They are generally unique and exist for a specific purpose. Less powerful or potent artifacts, or ones that are not unique, are generally called minor artifacts.

Reception 
20 magic items were highlighted in Io9's 2014 "The 20 Most WTF Magical Items in Dungeons & Dragons" list and the author described them as "magical items that I will simply call 'Artifacts of Dickishness' " — the article highlights items such as the Ring of Contrariness, the Ring of Bureaucratic Wizardry, the Brooch of Number Numbing and the Horn of Baubles.

Michael J. Tresca, in the book The Evolution of Fantasy Role-Playing Games (2011), highlighted that both mundane and magical items are key to Dungeons & Dragons combat but are also often overlooked. Tresca wrote, "be it mundane equipment the adventurer needs to survive or endless lists of magical items that give the character an advantage, equipment provides a means of artificially inflating a character's power level. As a result, adventurers obsessively catalogued every item they owned just to stay alive". The impact of hoarding items led to character encumbrance being "largely abandoned" at game tables over the various editions of the game since the bookkeeping became "too much of a hassle". Tresca also highlighted that enhancement values to basic stats became "exaggerated" over time: "magic armor bestowed a +1 bonus to armor class, magic weapons provided a +1 bonus to hit and damage, and so forth. These bonuses extend as high as +10 in some editions of Dungeons & Dragons".

Inspirations

Other fantasy stories 
 The Hand and Eye of Vecna were inspired by items appearing within Michael Moorcock's Corum novels: A left hand and left eye which are able to grant whoever replaces their existing hand and eye with them unusual powers.
 Ioun stones (pronounced EYE-oon) are based on similar artifacts from Jack Vance's Dying Earth series.  When functioning, they float in a circular pattern around their bearer's head, and grant various benefits based on their color and shape. Two stones of the same type will repel each other, and when drained of power, a stone becomes a dull grey, but still possesses the characteristic floating. While useless to a mage, burned out stones can still yield a single psionic power point to a psionic character in 3rd and 3.5 editions. In the original Jack Vance stories Ioun stones are highly prized by arch-magicians, and are acquired from a race known as the archveults, who mine them from remnants of dead stars (in his book Rhialto the Marvellous). In 2E Dungeons & Dragons it had been conjectured in Dragon magazine that Ioun stones instead come from the Positive Material Plane. Dragon #174 featured an article that included many dozens of new types of ioun stone, as well as an article about an elemental lord who hoards ioun stones on his home plane of radiance.  Under 3.0/3.5 editions of the rules they are instead manufactured by spellcasters in the same manner as other magical items.
 The Vorpal Sword is taken from Lewis Carrol's poem "Jabberwocky". In Dungeons & Dragons, the sword has specific properties relating to beheading, which is the method the blade in the poem uses to slay the titular monster.

Folklore and mythology 
 The Carpet of Flying is based upon the magic carpet of Persian mythology, later popularized in media through 1001 Arabian Nights and other adaptations.
 Winged Boots bear a similarity to the Winged Sandals worn by Hermes in Greek Mythology.
 The Broom of Flying is based upon Wiccan Rituals and artwork depicting Witches soaring through the air riding flying broomsticks.
 The Mirror of Life Trapping, a mirror which can steal and trap the souls of living persons, evokes the superstitions of several cultures surrounding mirror's ability to steal souls. During the Jewish mourning process of Shiva, mirrors in a house are to be covered in order to prevent the soul of the deceased from being trapped within them.
 The Flametongue, a sword with a blade engulfed in flame, is similar to other flaming swords appearing in mythology. Some examples of these are Dyrnwyn of Welsh Medieval tradition, and in some writings the Sword of Surtr is described as being flaming.

Further reading

References

 
Magic items